Luka Parkadze (born 27 July 2005) is a Georgian professional footballer who plays as a midfielder for Erovnuli Liga club Dinamo Tbilisi.

Professional career
Parkadze is a youth product of Dinamo Tbilisi, and began playing with their senior team in the Erovnuli Liga in 2022 at the age of 17. He signed a pre-contract with Bayern Munich II on 18 August 2022, starting on the 2023–24 season.
 
In September 2022, he was named by English newspaper The Guardian as one of the best players born in 2005 worldwide.

International career
Parkadze is a youth international for Georgia, having played for the Georgia U17s, and U18s.

Playing style
Parkadze is a versatile player who can play as an 8, 10, or as a winger. He can pass well with either foot, is a great dribbler, and has great vision.

References

External links
 

2005 births
Living people
Footballers from Tbilisi
Footballers from Georgia (country)
Georgia (country) youth international footballers
Association football midfielders
Erovnuli Liga players
FC Dinamo Tbilisi players